Olot District is a district of Bukhara Region in Uzbekistan. The capital lies at the city Olot.

The district consists of 1 city (Olot), 8 urban-type settlements (Ganchi Chandir, Kesakli, Qirtay, Sola qorovul, Jayxunobod, Oʻzbekiston, Chovdur, Boʻribek Chandir) and 10 rural communities.

The etymology of the name comes from the Turkic tribe Alat or Ala-at, also known in Arabic and Persian as Khalaj, and in Chinese as Boma, Hela, and Heloγ, all with a meaning "piebald horse". During the Middle Age, Alats played a prominent role in the history of southern Uzbekistan, Khorasan (Kalat), Persia and Afghanistan (Khalaj).

References

Bukhara Region
Districts of Uzbekistan